Waterworld is a series of video games released for the Super Nintendo Entertainment System, Virtual Boy, MS-DOS, Microsoft Windows and Game Boy, based on the film of the same name, along with unpublished versions for the Mega Drive/Genesis, Sega Saturn, Atari Jaguar, 3DO and PlayStation. These games were produced by Ocean Software. The SNES and Game Boy games were released only in Europe in 1995 and the Virtual Boy game was released exclusively in North America in November 1995. It was released for PC in 1997. The game received widespread negative reviews and the version released for the Virtual Boy is generally considered to be the worst game of its 22 releases.

Versions

Virtual Boy
The game is focused around the Mariner's (the main character) trimaran, which the player moves around a 3-D world, shooting enemies on personal water crafts called Smokers. It is a form of 3D shoot 'em up, similar to that of the All-Range Mode in Star Fox 64.

The objective is to keep the Smokers from grabbing Atollers (inhabitants of Atoll) placed around the playing field. To keep them from being captured, the player must shoot the Smokers using the L and R buttons on the Virtual Boy's controller while moving around with either of the two directional pads.

Like all other Virtual Boy games, Waterworld uses a red-and-black color scheme and uses parallax, an optical trick that is used to simulate a 3D effect. Multiplayer functionality was originally advertised for this version of Waterworld, but the Virtual Boy's link cable was never released, and multiplayer was not implemented in the final release.

Super NES
Waterworld for Super NES was released in 1995 in Europe by Ocean Software. It was only released in PAL territories, but an NTSC version had been scheduled for release in December 1995, and given a lengthy preview in that month's issue of Nintendo Power.

The game is played from an overhead/isometric perspective with the player controlling the Mariner's boat on the ocean. The point of the game was to destroy the Smokers' boats and dive for sunken artifacts, at which point the game switches to a side on perspective so that the player can directly control the Mariner underwater.

Game Boy
The Game Boy version is a side-scrolling platform game, released in PAL regions in 1995. As with the SNES version, this too was planned to be released in North America in December, receiving a short preview in Nintendo Power.

The player controls the Mariner, where levels take place both underwater and on land. The Mariner can run, crawl, jump, and swing across stage elements, as well as use a gun to defeat enemies. Additionally, there are isometric sections where he must sail on his trimaran, avoiding mines and shooting at Smokers.

Genesis
A Sega Genesis port of the Super NES version was also produced by Ocean. Planned for release in Europe in fall 1995, it was never distributed. A complete version of the game was eventually leaked on the internet.

Saturn
The cancelled Sega Saturn version of the game was to feature a 3D virtual ocean with a dynamic surface. It began development in late 1994.

Jaguar
The cancelled Atari Jaguar version was announced in early 1995 and planned to be released in the same year.

3DO
The 3DO version was announced in 1995 an planned to be published by Interplay.

PC
In April 1995, Interplay Entertainment announced that they had garnered the rights to make a Waterworld game. The game was developed by Intelligent Games and published by Interplay. It was released for MS-DOS and Microsoft Windows personal computers in 1997. It is a real-time strategy video game. The game contains 25 missions. In the game, players play as a War Chief and lead a taskforce of 2 to 14 men depending upon the mission. The main objective of the game is to amass enough hydro (fresh water), food, weapons, and critical information to successfully evade the "Smokers" and revert the inundated world to its former glory.

Reception

Waterworld received predominantly negative reviews. GameSpot gave the PC version a review score of 4.5/10. The SNES version was also poorly received, but has been praised for its soundtrack. French magazine Consoles + considered the Game Boy version to be the best, scoring it an 83% and praising its graphics and gameplay while criticizing its music.

The Virtual Boy version gathered particularly negative reviews for its poor gameplay and graphics. Sir Garnabus of GamePro panned it for having slow controls, bad collision detection, and the same enemies and victims in every level. He also criticized the lack of any backgrounds apart from the sunset, saying this mutes the 3D effect. Dave Frear of Nintendo Life claimed that the game was "crap", adding "with severely flawed visuals it can’t even gain points for impressing technically". The author of The Ultimate History of Video Games, Steven L. Kent, considers Waterworld to be the worst video game of all time. Seanbaby called Waterworld "the most horrible thing to ever be put inside a Virtual Boy".

See also
List of video games notable for negative reception

References

External links
 Waterworld MobyGames group
 Entry at Planet Virtual Boy
 Interview with Waterworld (Virtual Boy) designer, Steve Woita

1995 video games
Cancelled 3DO Interactive Multiplayer games
Cancelled Atari Jaguar games
Cancelled PlayStation (console) games
Cancelled Sega Genesis games
Cancelled Sega Saturn games
Game Boy games
Naval video games
Ocean Software games
Interplay Entertainment games
Super Nintendo Entertainment System games
Video games based on films
Video games developed in France
Virtual Boy games
Video games developed in the United States
Video games developed in the United Kingdom